Philonotis caespitosa is a species of moss belonging to the family Bartramiaceae.

It has almost cosmopolitan distribution.

References

Bartramiales